Lee Jeong-yeong (Korean: 이정영; born 3 January 1979) is a South Korean handball player. She competed in the women's tournament at the 2000 Summer Olympics.

References

External links

1979 births
Living people
South Korean female handball players
Olympic handball players of South Korea
Handball players at the 2000 Summer Olympics
21st-century South Korean women
Place of birth missing (living people)